Marcos Danilo Ureña Porras, known as Marco Ureña (born 5 March 1990), is a Costa Rican professional footballer who plays as a striker for  C.S. Cartaginés. He has also played for the Costa Rica national team.

Club career
Born in San José, Costa Rica, Ureña started his career at Primera División side Alajuelense and in March 2011, he joined Russian Premier League side Kuban Krasnodar.

In August 2014, Ureña moved to Danish Superliga side FC Midtjylland on a four-month loan deal. The contract was made permanent on 10 December 2014.

On 21 July 2016, Midtjylland and Brøndby IF agreed to swap Ureña with Jonas Borring in a three-year deal.

It was announced on 27 January 2017 that Ureña had been signed by Major League Soccer side San Jose Earthquakes. He scored his first MLS goal in a 2–1 road loss to New York City FC at Yankee Stadium on 1 April 2017. Ureña recorded his first MLS assist at home to achieve a 1–1 draw against Seattle Sounders FC on 8 April 2017. His game-winning goal over Minnesota United FC on 22 October secured San Jose's sixth-place spot in the 2017 MLS Cup Playoffs, the team's first playoff appearance since 2012.

On 12 December 2017, MLS expansion side Los Angeles FC selected Ureña as its third pick in the 2017 MLS Expansion Draft.

Following his release by Los Angeles, Ureña was selected by Chicago Fire in the MLS Waiver Draft on 12 December 2018. However, he opted to join Alajuelense on 21 January 2019.

On 24 March 2020, Ureña joined Gwangju FC of the South Korean K League.

On 22 December 2020, Urena signed with the Central Coast Mariners in the Australian A-League.

International career
Ureña participated in the 2009 FIFA U-20 World Cup for Costa Rica where Costa Rica U-20 national football team, placed 4th after losing to Hungary in the match for the 3rd place. He scored three goals on that competition.

In 2009, Ureña made his debut for the Costa Rica national football team in a match against Venezuela.

In June 2014, Ureña was named in Costa Rica's squad for the 2014 FIFA World Cup. In the team's opening match, he scored the third goal for Los Ticos in a 3–1 defeat of Uruguay.

At the 2017 CONCACAF Gold Cup, he scored the winner in Costa Rica's opening match and 0–1 victory against Honduras off of an assist from New York City FC man and fellow MLS player Rodney Wallace on 7 July 2017, at Red Bull Arena. This performance earned him CONCACAF Man of the Match honors.

On 1 September 2017, Ureña recorded a brace in Costa Rica's crucial World Cup qualifier against the United States, again at Red Bull Arena. On 5 September 2017, Ureña scored off of a volley to equalize the match against Mexico, which also served as his first goal at the Estadio Nacional de Costa Rica.

In May 2018 he was named in Costa Rica's 23 man squad for the 2018 FIFA World Cup in Russia. This would be Ureña's last call to play for Costa Rica. Upon his return to Costa Rican football in 2022, Ureña explained that his disappearance from the national team was due to internal conflicts he had with both players and personnel from the Costa Rican Football Federation. He cited Rónald González as the only coach that would call him up, but upon the arrival of Gustavo Matosas, Ureña knew he would not be called up anymore.

Career statistics

Club

International

International goals
Scores and results list Costa Rica's goal tally first.

Personal life
Ureña married Ana Paula Aguilar in May 2014.

Honours
Costa Rican Championship
Invierno 2010
2011 Copa Centroamericana Golden Boot

References

External links

1990 births
Living people
People from San José, Costa Rica
Association football forwards
Costa Rican footballers
Costa Rica international footballers
2011 Copa Centroamericana players
2011 CONCACAF Gold Cup players
2014 FIFA World Cup players
2014 Copa Centroamericana players
Copa América Centenario players
2017 CONCACAF Gold Cup players
2018 FIFA World Cup players
Copa Centroamericana-winning players
L.D. Alajuelense footballers
FC Kuban Krasnodar players
FC Midtjylland players
Brøndby IF players
San Jose Earthquakes players
Los Angeles FC players
Gwangju FC players
Central Coast Mariners FC players
Costa Rican expatriate footballers
Expatriate footballers in Russia
Expatriate men's footballers in Denmark
Expatriate soccer players in the United States
Expatriate footballers in South Korea
Expatriate soccer players in Australia
Costa Rican expatriate sportspeople in Russia
Costa Rican expatriate sportspeople in Denmark
Costa Rican expatriate sportspeople in the United States
Costa Rican expatriate sportspeople in South Korea
Costa Rican expatriate sportspeople in Australia
Liga FPD players
Russian Premier League players
Danish Superliga players
Major League Soccer players
K League 1 players
A-League Men players